Ali Mohamed Al-Balooshi (born 4 August 1987) is an Emirati middle-distance runner. He competed in the men's 800 metres at the 2004 Summer Olympics.

References

1987 births
Living people
Athletes (track and field) at the 2004 Summer Olympics
Emirati male middle-distance runners
Olympic athletes of the United Arab Emirates
Place of birth missing (living people)